is a former Japanese football player.

Club career
Ryuji Okada was born in Shizuoka Prefecture on September 6, 1974. After graduating from high school, he joined J1 League club Shimizu S-Pulse based in his local in 1993. On October 23, he debuted as substitute forward at the 77th minutes against Gamba Osaka in J.League Cup. However he could only play this match until 1994 and retired end of 1994 season.

Club statistics

References

External links

1974 births
Living people
Association football people from Shizuoka Prefecture
Japanese footballers
J1 League players
Shimizu S-Pulse players
Association football forwards